This is a list of World War I U-boat commanders. Only sunk and captured merchant ships are counted in the totals; warships and damaged ships are not.

Commanders killed in action are indicated by a  after their name. Those awarded the Pour le Mérite, Imperial Germany's highest honour, are designated with a PM.

Photographs may not always have been taken during World War I.

References

Lists of German military personnel